Zygomatic branches (referring to a structure near the zygomatic bone) may refer to:
 Zygomatic branches of facial nerve
 Zygomatic branch of the lacrimal artery